Turn It On is the third studio album released by Boyzone frontman and Irish singer-songwriter Ronan Keating. The album was released on 17 November 2003, a week after the release of the lead single, "Lost for Words". The album became the worst performing album of Keating's career to date, only peaking at number 21 on the UK Albums Chart. The album spawned two further singles: a cover of Kenny Rogers' "She Believes (In Me)" and a duet with American country superstar, LeAnn Rimes, "Last Thing on My Mind", which both became top ten hits in the United Kingdom.

Background
Following the success of Destination, and the four top ten singles which were released from it, Keating quickly returned to the studio in an attempt to record a follow-up which would replicate the success of Destination. Hooking up with producer Mark Taylor, who had at the time given chart-topping success to Spanish singer-songwriter Enrique Iglesias, Keating also collaborated with long-time collaborators Steve Robson and Steve Mac, as well as writing two songs with former co-writer Gregg Alexander. He also hooked up with American country superstar LeAnn Rimes, who at the time was also signed to his record label, Polydor, to record the duet "Last Thing on My Mind". He also recorded an updated version of "This is Your Song", one of four main recordings of the track, which have featured on Keating's releases across the years. The British version of the album contains two additional tracks. It was intended to include a hidden track "Getting Started", however this remains unreleased. The Latin American version of the album features the duet "The Flight", featuring Latin superstar Zucchero, and an updated version of "When You Say Nothing at All", featuring Spanish singer-songwriter Paulina Rubio, which was later released in the United Kingdom as the B-side to the single "Father & Son". The Special Edition has a blue interior whereas the regular has an orange interior.

Singles
 "Lost for Words" was released as the album's lead single on 10 November 2003, peaking at #9 on the UK Singles Chart. The song was co-written by Keating, alongside David Frank and Wayne Hector. The single was backed with the B-sides "I Couldn't Love You More" and "It Was You", as well an acoustic version and a remix by Robbie Rivera.
 "She Believes (in Me)" was released as the album's second single on 9 February 2004, peaking at #2 on the UK Singles Chart. A cover of the original by Kenny Rogers, the single was backed with live BBC Radio 2 sessions of "First Time" and "Lovin' Each Day", as well as a remix by Metro, and an updated radio version of "If Tomorrow Never Comes".
 "Last Thing on My Mind" was released as the album's third and final single on 7 June 2004, peaking at #5 on the UK Singles Chart. A duet with American country superstar LeAnn Rimes, the single was backed with remixes by Metro and Mo Monkey, as well as the music video, which received airplay on VH1 in the United States due to Rimes' appearance.

Track listing

Charts

Weekly charts

Year-end charts

Certifications

References

2003 albums
Ronan Keating albums
Albums produced by Mark Taylor (music producer)